Seogang Bridge or Grand Seogang Bridge is a bridge over the Han River in Seoul, South Korea.  The bridge links the Mapo and Yeongdeungpo districts. It is supported in the middle as it passes over the island of Bamseom.

Bridges in Seoul
Yeouido
Mapo District